Alphonsus is an ancient impact crater on the Moon that dates from the pre-Nectarian era. It is located on the lunar highlands on the eastern end of Mare Nubium, west of the Imbrian Highlands, and slightly overlaps the crater Ptolemaeus to the north. To the southwest is the smaller Alpetragius.

Description
The surface of Alphonsus is broken and irregular along its boundary with Ptolemaeus. The outer walls are slightly distorted and possess a somewhat hexagonal form.

A low ridge system of deposited ejecta bisects the crater floor, and includes the steep central peak designated Alphonsus Alpha (α). This pyramid-shaped formation rises to a height of 1.5 km above the interior surface. It is not volcanic in origin, but rather is made of anorthosite like the lunar highlands.

The floor is fractured by an elaborate system of rilles and contains four or five smaller craters surrounded by a symmetric darker halo. These dark-halo craters are cinder cone-shaped and are believed by some to be volcanic in origin, although others think they were caused by impacts that excavated darker mare material from underneath the lighter lunar regolith.

Exploration
The Ranger 9 probe impacted in Alphonsus, a short distance to the northeast of the central peak. Harold Urey said of a close-up photograph of Alphonsus:

Alphonsus was one of the primary alternative landing sites considered for both the Apollo 16 and the Apollo 17 missions.

Transient lunar phenomena
Alphonsus is one of the sites noted for transient lunar phenomena, as glowing red-hued clouds have been reported emanating from the crater. On October 26, 1956, the lunar astronomer Dinsmore Alter noted some blurring of the rilles on the floor of Alphonsus in the photographs he took in violet light. The same blurring did not occur in the infrared photographs he took at the same time. However, few professional astronomers found this evidence of volcanic activity on the Moon very convincing.

One astronomer who was intrigued by Alter's observations was Nikolai A. Kozyrev, from the Soviet Union. In 1958 while Kozyrev was looking for volcanic phenomenon on the moon, he observed the formation of a mist-like cloud within Alphonsus.  The spectrum of the area had been measured at this time, and displayed indications of carbon matter, possibly C2 gas. He believed this to be the result of volcanic or related activity. However no evidence for this phenomenon has been found from lunar missions, and the emission results have never been confirmed.

Names
Alphonsus is named after King Alfonso X of Castile (known as "Alfonso the Wise"), who had an interest in astronomy. Like many of the craters on the Moon's near side, it was given its name by Giovanni Riccioli, whose 1651 nomenclature system has become standardized; Riccioli originally named it "Alphonsus Rex" ('King Alfonso'), but the 'Rex' was later dropped. Earlier lunar cartographers had given the feature different names. Michael van Langren's 1645 map calls it "Ludovici XIV, Reg. Fran.", after Louis XIV of France, and Johannes Hevelius called it "Mons Masicytus" after a range of mountains in Lycia.

Interior craters

Five tiny craters in the northeastern part of Alphonsus' interior floor have been assigned names by the IAU. These are listed in the table below.

Satellite craters

By convention these features are identified on lunar maps by placing the letter on the side of the crater midpoint that is closest to Alphonsus.

References

Further reading

External links

Alphonsus at The Moon Wiki 
Rimae Alphonsus at The Moon Wiki
Alphonsus crater mantled floor fracture, from LROC
Lunar Orbiter map and photo of Alphonsus

Other related articles
 
 
  - one of three craters making up a Triad which includes Alphonsus
 
 
 

 

Impact craters on the Moon